Frankie Brown (born 8 October 1987) is a Scottish international footballer who currently plays for Bristol City in the FA WSL.

Playing career
A right sided defender, Brown began her footballing career with Falkirk Girls and was called up to the national under-17 squad in 2004. After leaving school to study at the University of Edinburgh, Brown joined Whitehill Welfare before moving to Hibernian. She also played in the UEFA Women's Champions League for Cypriot side Apollon Limassol alongside fellow Scot Hayley Lauder.

Brown was called up to the full Scotland squad for the first time in August 2008 and won her first cap the following month in a friendly match against Switzerland.

She attended the Scottish Football Association National Performance Centre at the University of Stirling as a PhD student. After graduating, Brown took up a research post at the University of Bath, and in April 2014 she left Hibs to join FA WSL side Bristol City.

In July 2014 Brown was involved in an altercation between her Bristol teammate Natalia Pablos and Birmingham City's Karen Carney. On the strength of Brown's witness statement, Carney was fined, banned and sent on an education course for telling Pablos to "fuck off back to Spain." Pablos branded Carney a "puta madre" during a lively exchange which Brown had drawn to the attention of the match referee.

References

External links

Hibernian GLFC profile

1987 births
Living people
Scottish women's footballers
Scotland women's international footballers
Hibernian W.F.C. players
Alumni of the University of Stirling
Apollon Ladies F.C. players
Expatriate women's footballers in Cyprus
Bristol City W.F.C. players
Women's Super League players
Women's association football defenders
Spartans W.F.C. players
Scottish expatriate women's footballers
Scottish expatriate sportspeople in Cyprus
UEFA Women's Euro 2017 players